Martin Lee "Marty" Erlichman (born 13 September 1929 in Brooklyn, New York, United States) is a manager in the entertainment industry who is best known for discovering Barbra Streisand and managing her career for over 50 years. Erlichman has produced award-winning and record-setting motion pictures, concerts, record albums, as well as network and cable television programs.

Erlichman was also the manager of The Clancy Brothers and Tommy Makem in the early 1960s and was responsible for the adoption of the Aran Sweaters as the visual identity of the bands.

Career as Barbra Streisand's manager
As manager for Streisand, he has negotiated all of her numerous recording, theater, motion picture, television, merchandise/licensing and live concert contracts. The Barbra Streisand concerts he produced include her 2006–2007 world tour as well as the millennium concert of 2000. In each of these concert venues Streisand set and still holds the all time box office record for live performance. He has been the executive producer of all Streisand's television specials and the producer on one of her films, For Pete’s Sake.

Other media credits
His other producer film credits include the highly successful Coma, starring Michael Douglas, Breathless, starring Richard Gere, and a number of the movies in the "Ernest" franchise. He represented the "Where's Waldo?" franchise and negotiated deals for this character in books, television and movies.

In addition to having received Emmy, Cable and Grammy nominations, Erlichman has won both an Emmy and a Peabody award as executive producer for Barbra Streisand: The Concert.

Erlichman is currently producing a 30 million dollar production of an original stage musical entitled Buzz!! with book by the late Larry Gelbart; music by Alan Menken; lyrics by David Zippel; directed by Rob Roth. He is also actively involved as producer of a Broadway stage version of the famous cartoon Tom and Jerry.

References

External links
Barbra Streisand's official website

Living people
1929 births
People from Brooklyn
Talent agents
Film producers from New York (state)
American music managers
Television producers from New York City